M107 most often refers to:
 XM107/M107 Barrett rifle, a semi-automatic .50 caliber rifle
 M107 (projectile), a 155 mm projectile used by the United States Army
 M107 self-propelled gun, an American 175 mm self-propelled gun

M107 may also refer to:

Military
 German minesweeper M 107
 HMS Pembroke (M107), a British Royal Navy minehunter
 M107 bomb; see M47 bomb

Other uses
 M-107 (Michigan highway), a former state highway in Michigan
 M107 (New York City bus), a bus route in Manhattan, New York City
 Irem M-107, an arcade system board
 Messier 107, a globular cluster in the constellation Ophiuchus
 the initial designation of the Soviet Klimov VK-107 aircraft engine